Casto Secundino María Méndez Núñez (July 1, 1824 – August 21, 1869) was a Spanish naval officer. In 1866 during the Chincha Islands War between Spain, Peru and Chile, he was general commander of the Spanish fleet in the Pacific. As such, he bombarded and destroyed the port of Valparaíso, and fought the Battle of Callao (during which he was injured nine times.) Méndez Núñez was the first man to circumnavigate the world on an ironclad warship: "Enloricata navis quae primo terram circuivit".

When Hugh Judson Kilpatrick, the American Minister to Chile, learned that Commodore Méndez Núñez was to bombard the port of Valparaíso, he asked the American naval commander Commodore John Rodgers to attack the Spanish fleet. Méndez Núñez famously responded with "I will be forced to sink [the US ships], because even if I have one ship left I will proceed with the bombardment. Spain, the Queen and I prefer honor without ships than ships without honor (España prefiere honra sin barcos a barcos sin honra.)"

Spanish Navy ships
Four Spanish Navy warships were named  Méndez Núñez in his honour, including:

 An armoured frigate, converted from screw frigate Resolución, renamed in 1870, retired in 1896 
 A Blas de Lezo-class cruiser built in 1924, retired in 1963
 The former USS O'Hare (DD-889), a Gearing-class destroyer 1973–1992
 An Álvaro de Bazán-class frigate commissioned in 2006

The municipality of Mendez, Cavite, Philippines, was also named in his honor.

See also

Related articles
 Plaza de Méndez Núñez

External links

Numancia (includes short biography)
Biography 
War Ensign used by Spanish Navy ships between 1785-1931
Ensign used by Navy ships belonging to the Ferrol Naval Department 1732
The "Revista Naval" page published in Ferrol in Spanish for the "Armada Española"

1824 births
1869 deaths
People from Vigo
Spanish admirals
People of the Chincha Islands War